The Cantão State Park is a state park in the state of Tocantins, Brazil.
It protects the Cantão wetlands, an area of igapó flooded forest in the ecotone where the Amazon rainforest merges into the cerrado.

Location

The Cantão State Park is located in the municipality of Pium, Tocantins.
The park is bounded to the west by the Araguaia River, which forms the border with the state of Pará.
The Javaés River separates the state park from the Araguaia National Park to the south.
It is bounded by the Ilha do Bananal / Cantão Environmental Protection Area to the east.
The park would be in the proposed South Amazon Ecotones Ecological Corridor.

History

The primary purpose is protecting fauna, flora and natural resources with tourism potential to ensure their rational, sustainable use compatible with preserving the local ecosystems.
The deliberative council was created in the same law.

The management plan was approved on 25 August 2005.
Ordnance 740 defined rules to be followed for the Projeto Quelônios for turtle conservation.
The buffer zone was defined in 2005.
The revised management plan was approved on 3 August 2016.
As of 2016 the park was supported by the Amazon Region Protected Areas Program.

Environment

The Cantão is a broad alluvial plain between the Araguaia River to the west and the Coco River to the east.
At one time the lower Coco was probably a meander of the Javaés, in turn a branch of the Araguaia.
The region is full of abandoned channels and lakes.
Floods connect the lakes in the rainy season for 2–6 months starting in October to form a single body of water, so species adapted to flooding are prevalent.

The Cantão holds an ecotone between the Amazon and the cerrado, and includes species typical of both biomes.
The lakes are nurseries for fish, turtles and alligators.
One survey identified 317 species of birds, including the endemic bananal antbird (Cercomacra ferdinandi) and Araguaia Spinetail  (Synallaxis simoni).
There is a large population of jaguars (Panthera onca).

Facilities

The park has an energy supply, guardhouse, visitor center, gazebo, accommodation, parking, staff residence, dock, vehicles and boats.
The park supports camping and recreation as well as scientific research.
It runs various educational activities such as lectures, workshops, training courses, video shows and monitored trails.

Notes

Sources

External links
  Instituto Araguaia

State parks of Brazil
Protected areas of Tocantins
1998 establishments in Brazil